Quanterus Smith (born November 26, 1989) is a former American football defensive end. He played college football at Western Kentucky. Smith was drafted in the fifth round, 146 overall by the Denver Broncos in the 2013 NFL Draft.

Early years
Smith attended Grayson High School in Loganville, Georgia. He earned First-team All-County honors while at high school. He also was lettered in Basketball for the Grayson Rams Basketball team.

College career
He was selected to Phil Steele's all-Sun Belt Conference third-team following his Sophomore season. He finished his Sophomore season with 47 tackles, 4 sacks, 2 pass deflections, and 2 forced fumbles. He finished his Junior season with a total of 38 tackles, 7.5 sacks. On November 19, 2012, he suffered a torn ACL in his left knee during a regular season game against Louisiana-Lafayette and would miss the remainder of his senior season. Following the conclusion of his Senior season on December 5, 2012, he was named Sun Belt Defensive Player of The Year for his outstanding breakout season in which he recorded 38 Tackles, Career High 12.5 Sacks, one pass deflection, one fumble recovery in which returned 75 yards for a touchdown and 3 Forced fumbles. He finished college with a total of 135 Tackles, 24 Sacks, 3 Pass Deflections and 5 Forced fumbles.

Professional career

Denver Broncos
Smith was drafted in the 5th round, 146th overall by the Denver Broncos in the 2013 NFL Draft. On May 10, 2013, Smith signed his rookie contract. On August 31, 2013, he was placed on injured reserve with an ACL injury. On April 28, 2015, Smith was waived.

New York Jets
On October 28, 2015, Smith was signed to the practice squad of the New York Jets. On November 19, 2015, he was released.

Jacksonville Jaguars
On November 23, 2015, Smith was signed to the practice squad of the Jacksonville Jaguars.

Detroit Lions 
On July 20, 2016, Smith signed to the Detroit Lions. On August 29, 2016, Smith was waived by the Lions.

He participated in The Spring League in 2017.

Personal life
On August 15, 2017, Smith was charged with armed robbery after he and a friend robbed an AT&T store at gun point and led police on a high speed chase in Douglas County, Georgia.

References

External links
Western Kentucky Hilltoppers bio
Denver Broncos bio
http://blogs.denverpost.com/broncos/2015/04/28/broncos-waive-defensive-end-quanterus-smith/33770/

American football defensive ends
1989 births
Living people
Western Kentucky Hilltoppers football players
Denver Broncos players
Players of American football from Georgia (U.S. state)
New York Jets players
Jacksonville Jaguars players
Detroit Lions players
The Spring League players
People from Decatur, Georgia
Sportspeople from DeKalb County, Georgia